Malmudden is a residential area in Luleå, Sweden. It is a beach-side community on the north coast of the Gulf of Bothnia, four kilometres northeast of central Luleå. It had 981 inhabitants in 2010.

References

External links
Malmudden at Luleå Municipality

Populated places in Luleå Municipality
Norrbotten